Chunghwa Post Co., Ltd. is the official postal service of Taiwan (officially the Republic of China). Chunghwa Post was a government agency of the Ministry of Transportation and Communications until 2003, when it was reorganized into a government-owned corporation.

Its affiliation with the Universal Postal Union began in 1914, but ended in 1972 when it was replaced by China Post shortly after China's seat in the United Nations was handed over to the People's Republic of China.

International reply coupons are not available to Taiwan, and mail is not delivered to or sent directly from Taiwan, but rather routed through third-party countries, with Japan Post as a major route facility for incoming mail sent from the Americas region. Under the name "Chinese Taipei", Taiwan is a member of Fédération Internationale de Philatélie and Inter-Asian Philatelic Federation. It also provides a savings account service.

Facilities 
Chunghwa Post delivers standard letters, registered mail, parcels, and express mail throughout Taiwan. There are twenty-three large offices throughout the country which supervises some 1,300 smaller post offices.

History

Origins of Chunghwa Post 
The direct ancestor of Chunghwa Post is the Customs Post Office of the Qing Empire, established in 1878 by Li Hongzhang at the suggestion of the foreign powers, with branch offices in five major trading cities. On 20 March 1896, the Customs Post Office became the Great Qing Post, which in 1911 became independent of the customs service.

On 1 January 1912, the Republic of China was established, replacing the Qing Dynasty. The Great Qing Post changed its name to the Chunghwa Post  "Chunghwa" is a transliteration of one of the names of China, which connotes the multi-ethnic nation under a unified culture of "China". Alternatively spelled "Zhonghua" (in pinyin transliteration), this term is part of the Chinese language name of both the Republic of China and the People's Republic of China.

Early airmail service
Chunghwa post had contracted with aviation groups such as China National Aviation Corporation and China Airways Federal to deliver airmail on the Shanghai-Hankow, Nanking-Peking, and the Hankow-Canton routes in early 1929. It was on the Nanking-Peking route, where renown early-20th century poet Xu Zhimo caught a flight, but died as the airmail-carrier plane operated by China Airways Federal under contract, crashed in rough weather.

Early postal service in Taiwan
In 1888, Liu Mingchuan, Qing Governor of Taiwan Province, established the Taiwan General Post Office (GPO) of the Great Qing Postal service (大清郵政官局). However, in 1895, Taiwan was ceded to Japan following the first Sino-Japanese war. The Taiwan GPO was abolished, with postal service in Taiwan conducted by a variety of bodies such as the Field Command postal service, and after 1924, the Letters Department of the Ministry of Transport.

After World War II 

Taiwan was taken over by the Republic of China in 1945. In 1946, the Republic of China government incorporated the postal service in Taiwan with the Directorate General of Posts. In 1949, the Republic of China lost control of much of mainland China to the Communist Party of China which founded the People's Republic of China. Soon after, postal service was restricted to Taiwan, several surrounding islands, and a few islands off the coast of mainland China still under the control of the Republic of China government. In 2003, the Directorate General of Posts of the Ministry of Transportation and Communications was restructured from a government department to a government-owned corporation, and renamed Chunghwa Post Co., Ltd.

Name changes 

In February 2007, ROC President Chen Shui-bian announced that the name of the postal service would be changed to Taiwan Post, with sign changes occurring at branches in Taiwan on February 12. Media reports noted that "Taiwan Post" was more consistent with the name Governor Liu Ming-chuan used when he founded the Taiwan Post Administration in 1888. Furthermore, Taiwan Post began printing "Taiwan" instead of "Republic of China" on postage stamps.

On February 9, the board of directors resolved to change the name of the corporation to Taiwan Post Co. (台灣郵政) after a delay of several hours due to protests from unions. However, a bill to recognise the change of law was blocked by the KMT-dominated legislature. As a result, the law still mandated the postal monopoly for "Chunghwa Post" despite the name change.

In 2008, the Kuomintang took power in Taiwan following a legislative election victory and the election of Ma Ying-jeou to the presidency. Following his election, Ma Ying-jeou publicly stated that he did not wish his inauguration commemoration stamps to be marked "Taiwan Post", because the name change was illegal. The postal service marked the inauguration stamps with Chinese characters for the "Republic of China", as well as "Republic of China (Taiwan)" in English.

On 1 August 2008, the company resolved to reverse the name change and restored the name "Chunghwa Post". The Board of Directors, as well as resolving to restore the name of the corporation, also resolved to re-hire the chief executive dismissed in 2007, and to withdraw defamation proceedings against him.

See also 

 China Post
 Chunghwa Postal Museum
 List of postal services abroad

References

External links 

 

Government-owned companies of Taiwan
Companies established in 1878
Postal system of Taiwan
Companies based in Taipei
Taiwanese brands
1878 establishments in China